Šatijai is a village near Kaunas in Lithuania. It has a red brick estate, built in 1889 by the Christauskai family. In 1966 the estate consisted of a house, large stables, barn, granary, smithy, and garden. Until restoration of Lithuania's independence in 1990, the estate was neglected and fell in ruins. Consequently, the building was restored and turned into a restaurant and guesthouse. According to the 2011 census, the village had 415 residents.

References 

Villages in Kaunas County